The following lists events that happened in 1955 in Iceland.

Incumbents
President – Ásgeir Ásgeirsson
Prime Minister – Ólafur Thors

Events

Births

20 April – Steinunn Thorarinsdottir, sculptor
8 May – Ásgeir Sigurvinsson, footballer
17 July – Valgerður Gunnarsdóttir, politician.
31 July – Kolbrún Halldórsdóttir, politician
4 August – Steingrímur J. Sigfússon, politician
14 September – Guðjón Þórðarson, footballer.
2 December – Einar Kristinn Guðfinnsson, politician

Deaths

References

 
1950s in Iceland
Iceland
Iceland
Years of the 20th century in Iceland